is a Japanese actress. She appeared in more than ten films since 1965.

|Filmography

References

External links
 

1946 births
Living people
People from Tokyo
Japanese film actresses